Jamalpur-4 is a constituency represented in the Jatiya Sangsad (National Parliament) of Bangladesh since 2019 by Murad Hasan of the Awami League.

Boundaries 
The constituency encompasses Sarishabari Upazila.

History 
The constituency was created in 1978 a Mymensingh constituency when the former Mymensingh District was split into two districts: Jamalpur and Mymensingh.

Ahead of the 2008 general election, the Election Commission redrew constituency boundaries to reflect population changes revealed by the 2001 Bangladesh census. The 2008 redistricting altered the boundaries of the constituency.

Ahead of the 2018 general election, the Election Commission reduced the boundaries of the constituency by removing two union parishads of Jamalpur Sadar Upazila: Meshta and Titpalla.

Members of Parliament

Elections

Elections in the 2010s

Elections in the 2000s

Elections in the 1990s

References

External links
 

Parliamentary constituencies in Bangladesh
Jamalpur District